The history of photovoltaic growth includes previous forecast and annual deployment figures by country.

Deployment reports 

Most PV deployment figures in this article are provided by the European Photovoltaic Industry Association in the "Global Outlook for Photovoltaics" report, the Observatoire des énergies renouvelables or EurObserv'ER's "Photovoltaic Barometer" report, and the IEA-PVPS (photovoltaic power systems) "Snapshot" and "Trends" report.

 EPIA

 2014 – Global Market Outlook for Photovoltaics 2014–2018
 2013 – Global Market Outlook for Photovoltaics 2013–2017
 2012 – Global Market Outlook for Photovoltaics until 2016
 2011 – Global Market Outlook for Photovoltaics until 2015
 2010 – Global Market Outlook for Photovoltaics until 2014
 2009 – Global Market Outlook for Photovoltaics until 2013
 2008 – Global Market Outlook for Photovoltaics until 2012

The European Photovoltaic Industry Association (EPIA) represents members of the entire PV industry from silicon producers to cells and module manufactures and PV systems installers to PV electricity generation as well as marketing and sales. EPIA releases its annual Global Market Outlook for Photovoltaics report in May/June.

 PV-Barometer

 2015 – figures for year 2013 and 2014
 2014 – figures for year 2012 and 2013
 2013 – figures for year 2011 and 2012
 2012 – figures for year 2010 and 2011
 2011 – figures for year 2009 and 2010
 2010 – figures for year 2008 and 2009

EUROBSER'VER was set up in 1980, and is composed of engineers and experts releasing the Photovoltaic Barometer report containing early, year-end PV deployment figures for the 28 member states of the European Union. Eurobserver works closely together with several French ministries and is co-founded by the European Commission's IEE programm.

IEA-PVPS

 2015 – Snapshot of Global PV 1992-2014
 2014 – Trends 2014 in Photovoltaic Applications – Survey report of selected IEA countries between 1992 and 2013
 2014 – Snapshot of Global PV 1992-2013
 2014 – Trends 2013 in Photovoltaic Applications – Survey report of selected IEA countries between 1992 and 2012
 2013 – Snapshot of Global PV 1992-2012
 2011 – Trends in Photovoltaic Applications – Survey report of selected IEA countries between 1992 and 2010
 2010 – Trends in Photovoltaic Applications – Survey report of selected IEA countries between 1992 and 2009
 2009 – Trends in Photovoltaic Applications – Survey report of selected IEA countries between 1992 and 2008
 2007 – Trends in Photovoltaic Applications – Survey report of selected IEA countries between 1992 and 2006

The IEA Photovoltaic Power Systems Programme (PVPS) is one of the collaborative R&D agreements established within the IEA and, since its establishment in 1993, the PVPS participants have been conducting a variety of joint projects in the application of photovoltaic conversion of solar energy into electricity. Its annual "Snapshot" report is released in early April and provides the first and detailed figures of worldwide PV-deployment of the previous year. An overview of all international statistics PDF reports since 1995 can be found on IEA-PVPS' Statistic Reports website.

Deployment by country 

2015

See section Forecast for projected photovoltaic deployment in 2015

2014

2013

Worldwide

In 2013, worldwide deployment of solar PV amounted to almost 40 GW (39,953 MW)—an increase of about 35 percent over the previous year. Cumulated capacity increased by 38 percent to more than 139 GW. This is sufficient to generate at least 160 terawatt-hours (TWh) or 0.85 percent of the world's total electricity consumption of 18,400 TWh.

An uncertainty in Chinese deployment was the reason for a significant discrepancy between EPIA's outlook and IEA's Trends reports. EPIA did not take 1.1 GW of additional Chinese deployment into account, since at the time it was unsure whether these installations were connected to the grid. In IEA's final Trends report, the confirmed figures not only raised domestic Chinese deployment from 11.8 GW to 12.92 GW, but also contributed to increase global figures to almost 40 GW.

 Regions

In 2013, Asia has been the fastest growing region, with China and Japan accounting for 49% of worldwide deployment. About a quarter has been installed in Europe (10,975 MW). The remaining quarter of the 38,400 MW deployed in 2013 is split between North America and other countries.

Europe is still the most developed region with a cumulative capacity of 81.5 GW, about 59 percent of the global total, followed by the Asia-Pacific region (APAC), including countries such as Japan, India and Australia with 22 GW or about 16 percent of worldwide cumulative capacity (due to its significance, China is excluded from the APAC region in all PV statistics and listed separately). European solar PV now covers 3 percent of the electricity demand and 6 percent of the peak electricity demand. However, deployment in Europe has slowed down by half compared to the record year of 2011, and will most likely continue to decrease. This is mainly due to the strong decline of new installations in Germany and Italy.

Cumulative capacity in the MEA (Middle East and Africa) region and ROW (rest of the world) accounted for less than 3 GW or about 2.2% of the global total. A great untapped potential remains for many of these countries, especially in the Sunbelt.

Countries

In 2013, the world's top installer were China (+12.92 GW), followed by Japan (+6.97 GW) and the United States (+4.75 GW), while Germany remained the world's largest overall producer of power from solar PV, with a total capacity around 36 GW and contributing 5.7% to its net electricity consumption. Italy met more than 7% of its electricity demands with solar PV, thus leading the world in that respect.

The top ten leading countries in terms of deployed and overall PV-capacity are shown above. Other mentionable PV deployments above the 100-megawatt mark included France (643 MW), Canada (445 MW), South Korea (445 MW), Thailand (437 MW), The Netherlands (360 MW), Switzerland (319 MW), Ukraine (290 MW), Austria (263 MW), Israel (244 MW), Belgium (237 MW), Taiwan (170 MW) Denmark (156 MW) and Spain (116 MW).

In 2013, Europe added 11 gigawatts of new PV installation (including non-EU countries). It is still the most developed region with a cumulated total of 81.5 GW, about 59 percent of the worldwide installed capacity. Solar PV now covers 3 percent of the electricity demand and 6 percent of the peak electricity demand. However, European PV deployment has slowed down by half compared to the record year of 2011, and will most likely continue to decrease. This is mainly due to the strong decline of new installations in Germany and Italy.

2012

2011

2010

2009

2008

2007

Off grid refers to photovoltaics which are not grid connected. On grid means connected to the local electricity grid. Δ means the amount installed during the previous year. Σ means the total amount installed. Wp/capita refers to the ratio of total installed capacity divided by total population, or total installed Wp per person. Module price is average installed price, in Euros. kW·h/kWp·yr indicates the range of insolation to be expected. While National Report(s) may be cited as source(s) within an International Report, any contradictions in data are resolved by using only the most recent report's data. Exchange rates represent the 2006 annual average of daily rates (OECD Main Economic Indicators June 2007).Module Price: Lowest:2.5 EUR/Wp (2.83 USD/Wp) in Germany 2003. Uncited insolation data is from maps dating 1991–1995.

2006

Notes: While National Report(s) may be cited as source(s) within an International Report, any contradictions in data are resolved by using only the most recent report's data. Exchange rates represent the 2006 annual average of daily rates (OECD Main Economic Indicators June 2007)Module Price: Lowest:2.5 EUR/Wp (2.83 USD/Wp) in Germany 2003. Uncited insolation data is lifted from maps dating 1991–1995.
 

2005

Original source gives these individual numbers and totals them to 37,500 kW. The 2004 reported total was 30,700 kW. With new installations of 6,800 kW, this would give the reported 37,500 kW.

2004

Notes

References 
 

Electrical-engineering-related lists
Photovoltaics